Pristimantis buccinator is a species of frog in the family Strabomantidae.
It is found in Peru, and possibly Brazil and Bolivia.
Its natural habitat is tropical moist lowland forests.

References

buccinator
Endemic fauna of Peru
Amphibians of Peru
Amphibians described in 1994
Taxonomy articles created by Polbot